Gare is a surname. Notable people with the name include:

 Anna Gare (born 1969), Australian musician, cook, author and television personality
 Arran Gare (born 1948), Australian philosopher
 Danny Gare (born 1954), Canadian NHL player, coach and personality
 Josh Gare (born 1992), English computer programmer and internet entrepreneur
 Lanny Gare (born 1978), Canadian-born German professional ice hockey centre
 Lou Gare (1939–2017), British jazz saxophonist
 Nene Gare (1919–1994) Australian writer and artist
 Øystein Gåre, (1954–2010) Norwegian footballer

See also
 Gare (disambiguation)
 Gere (surname)

surnames